Oskar Ospelt (27 July 1908 – 15 June 1988) was a Liechtenstein sprinter. He competed in the men's 100 metres at the 1936 Summer Olympics. He also competed in the men's discus.

References

1908 births
1988 deaths
Athletes (track and field) at the 1936 Summer Olympics
Liechtenstein male sprinters
Liechtenstein male discus throwers
Olympic athletes of Liechtenstein
Place of birth missing